Anu Marjo Pirttimaa (born 4 June 1972) is a Finnish sprinter. She competed in the women's 4 × 100 metres relay at the 1996 Summer Olympics.

References

External links
 

1972 births
Living people
Athletes (track and field) at the 1996 Summer Olympics
Finnish female sprinters
Olympic athletes of Finland
People from Ylivieska
Olympic female sprinters
Sportspeople from North Ostrobothnia